Heckman's Island  is a community in the Canadian province of Nova Scotia, located in the Lunenburg Municipal District in Lunenburg County.  After Mi'kmaq fighters killed John Payzant's father and brother in the Raid on Lunenburg (1756), they were buried on Heckman's Island.

References

External links
Heckman's Island on Destination Nova Scotia

Communities in Lunenburg County, Nova Scotia
General Service Areas in Nova Scotia